Tarlan (also Romanized as Ţarlān; also known as Ţarlā) is a village in Khosrow Beyk Rural District, Milajerd District, Komijan County, Markazi Province, Iran. At the 2006 census, its population was 181, in 59 families.

References 

Populated places in Komijan County